Vilnius Airport Railway Station is a railway station in Vilnius International Airport, Lithuania, which was opened on 2 October 2008. As for 2019, railbuses running between Vilnius Airport and Vilnius Central Station are the only passenger service of the station and are the fastest (7 min) and the cheapest (€0.80) way to go from the airport to the city centre, but there are only 7 trains during the day with intervals from 30 min to 5 h 45 min. Vilnius airport is one of the two airports in the Baltic states to have a direct rail connection with the city centre (the other one being Tallinn Airport, which since September 2017 has a direct tram connection to Tallinn downtown (with intervals of 6 minutes, journey taking by 19 minutes).

References

External links
 Lithuanian railways
 Vilnius airport
 Lithuanian Railways Timetable

Airport railway stations
Railway stations in Vilnius